Victor Vásquez (born July 8, 1993) is an American soccer player who plays as a defender for Cal FC in the United Premier Soccer League.

Career

College & Amateur
Vásquez played three years of college soccer at Cal State Northridge between 2013 and 2015 after transferring from Humboldt State University. In 2016, Vásquez played with USL PDL side FC Golden State Force.

Professional
Vásquez signed with United Soccer League club Phoenix Rising on December 15, 2016.

References

1993 births
Living people
American soccer players
Cal State Northridge Matadors men's soccer players
Puget Sound Gunners FC players
FC Golden State Force players
Phoenix Rising FC players
Association football defenders
Soccer players from Anaheim, California
USL League Two players
USL Championship players
United Premier Soccer League players
Cal FC players
Humboldt State Lumberjacks men's soccer players